Michael Vinícius Silva de Morais (born 19 April 1993), simply known as Michael, is a Brazilian professional footballer who plays as a forward for Bangladesh Premier League club Rahmatganj.

Career
In April 2019, Michael went on a trial at FC Linköping City in Sweden. The trial went well, and the club announced that they had signed with the player on 17 April. The player signed for one year and got shirt number 23. On the same day as the official announcement - on 19 January - Michael got his debut against BK Forward and also scored in that game.

References

External links
 
 
 
 

Living people
1993 births
Brazilian footballers
Association football forwards
Campeonato Brasileiro Série A players
Primeira Liga players
Ettan Fotboll players
Fluminense FC players
Criciúma Esporte Clube players
G.D. Estoril Praia players
América Futebol Clube (MG) players
Resende Futebol Clube players
América Futebol Clube (Teófilo Otoni) players
Brazilian expatriate footballers
Brazilian expatriate sportspeople in Portugal
Expatriate footballers in Portugal
FC Linköping City players
Iwate Grulla Morioka players
Expatriate footballers in Sweden
Vasalunds IF players
Asante Kotoko S.C. players
River Atlético Clube players
Artsul Futebol Clube players
Rahmatganj MFS players
Expatriate footballers in Bangladesh
Bangladesh Premier League players
Brazilian expatriate sportspeople in Sweden
Brazilian expatriate sportspeople in Bangladesh